Suphisellus rubripes is a species of burrowing water beetle in the subfamily Noterinae. It was described by Boheman in 1858 and is found in Argentina and Uruguay.

References

Suphisellus
Beetles described in 1858